Doree Shafrir (born May 16, 1977) is an American author and podcast host. She was previously an editor at Rolling Stone, Gawker and The New York Observer and a senior writer at BuzzFeed. She is the author of the novel STARTUP and co-editor of the collection Love, Mom: Poignant, Goofy, Brilliant Messages from Home.

Career
Shafrir departed a history Ph.D. program to begin her career in journalism at the Philadelphia Weekly, then joining the staff of Gawker in its early years. She next worked for Rolling Stone before joining Buzzfeed in 2012 as an editor and culture writer.

Shafrir founded the Postcards From Yo Momma website with Jessica Grose, in 2008,where they posted reader-contributed electronic messages (texts, instant messages, and emails) from their mothers. She and Grose produced a book based on the site, titled Love, Mom: Poignant, Goofy, Brilliant Messages from Home, which was published by Hyperion in March 2009.

Shafrir has co-hosted the podcast Forever35, with Kate Spencer, since 2018. She is also the host of Matt and Doree's Eggcellent Adventure, alongside husband Matt Mira, focused on the couple's experience with infertility and having a child via IVF.

STARTUP
Shafrir's first novel, STARTUP, was published by Little, Brown on April 25, 2017. Reviewing the novel in The New York Times, Lara Vapnyar called the book "a biting and astute debut novel". In Rolling Stone, Helen Holmes notes Shafrir is a "a seasoned veteran in the world people still refer to as 'new media'" and says Shafrir's extensive experience in the world she describes "helps give Startup its legs. Her measured eye and wealth of understanding is clear in the rendering of characters like Isabel, an assistant who casually leaves her phone on a coffee table when she goes to the bathroom because the notion of someone snatching it is unthinkable, and Victor, an out-of-work boyfriend convinced he's smarter and more important than his employed partner."

Personal life
Shafrir lived in New York for nine years before moving to Los Angeles, where she lives with husband Matt Mira, a comedy writer and podcaster. In an interview with Nerdist Ami Shafrir and Mira described meeting through the Tinder dating app. She said she feared they set an unrealistic example, because they fell in love with the first person they met on the site.

References

External links
 Postcards from Yo Momma website
 Love, Mom: Poignant, Goofy, Brilliant Messages from Home at Hyperion Books
 Startup at Hachette Book Group

American women editors
Writers from New York City
Living people
21st-century American novelists
American women novelists
Place of birth missing (living people)
BuzzFeed people
Novelists from New York (state)
21st-century American women writers
1977 births
American magazine editors
Women magazine editors
American online publication editors